El verdugo de Sevilla ("The Executioner of Seville") is a 1942 Mexican film. It stars Sara García and Fernando Soler. It is based on a play by Pedro Muñoz Seca. It was made as part of a series of Mexican films set in Spain in the 1940s, such as Dos mexicanos en Sevilla (1942).

Cast 
 Fernando Soler as Don Bonifacio Bonilla                                                                        
 Sara García as Doña Nieves                                                                       
 Domingo Soler as Sansoni                                                                        
 Julio Villarreal as Talmilla                                                                        
 Miguel Arenas as Sinapismo

References

External links
 

1942 films
1940s Spanish-language films
Films based on works by Pedro Muñoz Seca
Mexican black-and-white films
1940s Mexican films